was a Japanese Olympic freestyle swimmer who competed in the 1952 Summer Olympics and in the 1956 Summer Olympics.

References

1934 births
1996 deaths
Japanese male freestyle swimmers
Olympic swimmers of Japan
Swimmers at the 1952 Summer Olympics
Swimmers at the 1956 Summer Olympics
Asian Games medalists in swimming
Swimmers at the 1954 Asian Games
Asian Games gold medalists for Japan
Medalists at the 1954 Asian Games
20th-century Japanese people